Madagascar 3: Europe's Most Wanted (Music from the Motion Picture) is the soundtrack album to the 2012 film Madagascar 3: Europe's Most Wanted, the third instalment in the Madagascar franchise. The album was released on June 5, 2012 by Interscope Records, and featured original songs and score, produced by Hans Zimmer, who worked on the franchise's previous instalments. The album featured popular dance singles, accompanying few original songs written specially for the film.

Album information 
In some variations of the soundtrack, "Cool Jerk" is featured in replacement of "We No Speak Americano". "Sexy and I Know It" by LMFAO was only used in the theatrical trailer, and not included on the soundtrack and was replaced by "Firework" for the circus. "Any Way You Want It" by Journey and the instrumental "Watermark" from the album of the same name by Enya were also used, but are not included on the soundtrack. "Land of Hope and Glory" by Edward Elgar appears in the track "Fur Power".  The "Afro Circus" tune is from "Entrance of the Gladiators", by the Czech composer Julius Fučík.

Track listing

Reception 
The Joy of Movies wrote "this soundtrack is all in good fun and makes for a quite enjoyable ride." James Southall of Movie Wave gave a mixed review to the album, saying "Quite who the rest of the album’s meant to appeal to – its curious mix of awful versions of decent songs, decent original recordings of songs and score which spends much of its time referencing other music just doesn’t work." James Christopher Monger of AllMusic wrote "Five of the thirteen tracks are Zimmer instrumentals, and while they may not be as memorable as anything from the Lion King, each piece dutifully projects the composer's mastery of the genre." Filmtracks.com wrote "like Madagascar: Escape 2 Africa, a much larger share of score material needed to be included on the commercial album for Madagascar 3: Europe's Most Wanted. The third score may not be as cohesive as the second, but it also deserves better treatment despite its questionable Holkenborg contributions."

Chart performance 
The track "Afro Circus/I Like to Move It" peaked at 7 on the ARIA Hitseekers Singles chart on the week commencing October 15, 2012.

Accolades

Personnel 
Credits adapted from Allmusic.

 Slamm Andrews – mixing, music editor
 Laurence Anslow – assistant engineer
 Max Aruj – technical assistance
 Peter Asher – composer, music consultant, producer, soundtrack producer
 Bob Badami – soundtrack producer
 Lorne Balfe – additional music
 Chris Barnett – assistant engineer
 Victoria Beckham – composer
 Charles Brown – composer
 Melanie Brown – composer
 Emma Bunton – composer
 Julie Butchko – music clearance
 Dan Butler – music business affairs
 Renato Carosone – composer
 Lori Castro – mixing assistant
 Melanie Chisholm – composer
 Chuck Choi – technical consultant
 Paul Clarvis – percussion
 Robert Clivillés – composer
 Rupert Coulson – engineer
 DCUP – primary artist
 Ester Dean – composer
 Charles Dumont – composer
 Matt Dunkley – score reader
 Mikkel Storleer Eriksen – composer
 Tom Farnon – score reader
 Geoff Foster – engineer
 Bruce Fowler – supervising orchestrator
 Walt Fowler – orchestration
 Rick Giovinazzo – orchestration
 Gavin Greenaway – score conductor
 Will Greig – technical assistance
 Geri Halliwell – composer
 Matthew Handley – arranger
 Cornell Haynes – composer
 Tor Erik Hermansen – composer
 Stephen Hilton – arranger, producer
 Aleksey Igudesman – soloist
 Danny Jacobs – primary artist
 Kevin Kaska – orchestration
 Andrew Kawczynski – technical assistance
 Gary Kettel – percussion
 Jasha Klebe – arranger
 Daniel Kresco – engineer, mixing
 Duncan Maclennan – arranger
 Frances McDormand – primary artist
 Ladd McIntosh – orchestration
 Liz McNicoll – music business affairs
 Metro Voices – choir/chorus
 Adam Miller – assistant engineer
 Perry Montague-Mason – orchestra leader
 Nils Montan – mixing assistant
 Yvonne S. Moriarty – orchestration
 Erick Morillo – composer
 Ed Neumeister – orchestration
 Katy Perry – composer, primary artist
 Mark Quashie – composer
 Frank Ricotti – percussion
 Chris Rock – composer, primary artist
 Matthew Rowbottom – composer
 Czarina Russell – studio manager
 Nicola Salerno – composer
 Jennifer Schiller – music business affairs
 Sheila E. – soloist
 Andrew Stanley – arranger
 Richard "Biff" Stannard – composer
 Dave Stewart – composer, primary artist
 Jill Streater – librarian
 Pat Sullivan – Mastering
 Ian Thomas – percussion
 Michel Vaucaire – composer
 Jessica Weiss – assistant music editor, backing vocals
 Christian Wenger – assistant engineer
 Lucy Whalley – assistant contractor
 Booker T. White – score preparation
 Sandy Wilhelm – composer
 Freedom Williams – composer
 Pharrell Williams – composer
 Yolanda Be Cool – primary artist
 Andrew Zack – score coordinator
 Hans Zimmer – composer, primary artist, producer, soundtrack producer

References 

2012 soundtrack albums
Hans Zimmer soundtracks
Interscope Records soundtracks
Classical albums
Hip hop soundtracks
Reggae soundtracks
Dance-pop soundtracks
Pop soundtracks
Madagascar (franchise)